A repository of modern knowledge, subtitled a
Encyclopedia of sciences and political social life is a Hungarian lexicon published in the middle of the 19th century.

History 
The large-scale work published by Gusztáv Heckenast in Pest between 1850 and 1855 processed the various branches of knowledge in six volumes. There is still no facsimile edition of the work, but the volumes are available in electronic form free of charge from Google Books, cf. below.

Order of volumes

Sources 
 Petrik Géza: Magyarország bibliographiája 1712–1860 (I–IV.), Budapest, 1888–1892, 

Hungarian encyclopedias
19th-century encyclopedias